The 2020 New York Red Bulls season was the club's twenty-fifth season in Major League Soccer, the top division of soccer in the United States.

Team information

Squad information

Appearances and goals are career totals from all-competitions.

Roster transactions

In

Out

Total expenditure: $0

Total revenue: $2,255,000

Net income: $2,255,000

Draft picks

Preseason and friendlies

Major League Soccer season

Eastern Conference

Overall

Results summary

Matches

MLS Cup Playoffs

U.S. Open Cup

New York Red Bulls will enter the 2020 U.S. Open Cup in the Round of 32.

Leagues Cup

New York Red Bulls will enter the 2020 Leagues Cup in the Round of 16.

MLS is Back Tournament

On June 10, MLS announced that a bracket format named "MLS is Back Tournament" would begin July 8 at ESPN Wide World of Sports Complex in Walt Disney World, and end with the final on August 11.

Competitions summary
As of 21 November 2020.

Player statistics

As of 21 November 2020.

|-
! colspan="14" style="background:#dcdcdc; text-align:center"| Goalkeepers

|-
! colspan="14" style="background:#dcdcdc; text-align:center"| Defenders

|-
! colspan="14" style="background:#dcdcdc; text-align:center"| Midfielders

|-
! colspan="14" style="background:#dcdcdc; text-align:center"| Forwards

|-
! colspan="14" style="background:#dcdcdc; text-align:center"| Left Club During Season

|}

Top scorers

As of 21 November 2020.

Assist Leaders

As of 21 November 2020.
This table does not include secondary assists.

Shutouts 

As of 21 November 2020.

Disciplinary record 

As of 21 November 2020.

References

New York Red Bulls
New York Red Bulls
New York Red Bulls
New York Red Bulls seasons